Walter Newton "Newt" Male Jr. (June 8, 1933–April 20, 2003) was an American politician who served as a Republican member of the Kansas House of Representatives from 1973 to 1974. He represented the 77th District and lived in Augusta, Kansas. He was succeeded by fellow Republican Bob Whittaker.

References

1933 births
2003 deaths
Republican Party members of the Kansas House of Representatives
20th-century American politicians
People from Augusta, Kansas